Touré Embden (born September 3, 1964), known by the stage name MC Tee, is a Jamaican American emcee and co-founder (with DJ Kurtis Mantronik) of the 1980s old school hip hop and electro funk group Mantronix.

Early years 
MC Tee was born in Jamaica, emigrated with his family to the United States and eventually settled in the Flatbush section of Brooklyn, New York.

Mantronix emcee 

In 1984, Brooklyn native MC Tee met Kurtis Mantronik at Downtown Records in Manhattan, where MC Tee was a regular customer, and Mantronik worked as the in-store DJ. The duo soon made a demo, formed the group Mantronix, and eventually signed with Sleeping Bag Records.

MC Tee co-wrote Mantronix's debut single, "Fresh is the Word," a club hit in 1985, reaching #16 on the Hot Dance Singles Sales chart. "Fresh is the Word" was featured on Mantronix's debut album, Mantronix: The Album, which was released the same year.

Mantronix's second album, Music Madness, was released in 1986.  While MC Tee's rhyming style on the album continued in the traditional b-boy fashion of the times, Mantronik's club oriented production and mixing in Music Madness tended to attract more dance music and electro funk aficionados than hardcore, old school hip hop fans.

In 1987, Mantronix signed with Capitol/EMI and released In Full Effect the following year (1988). MC Tee abruptly left Mantronix shortly after the release of In Full Effect to enlist in the United States Air Force.

In a 1997 interview with MTV Europe, Kurtis Mantronik commented on the departure of MC Tee from Mantronix:

Mantronix continued for two more albums following MC Tee's departure, 1990's This Should Move Ya and 1991's The Incredible Sound Machine, with Bryce "Luvah" Wilson replacing MC Tee, before the group finally disbanded in 1991.

Current whereabouts 
Touré Embden was arrested and subsequently convicted of child molestation and given a 15 Year term in 2003. He served 6 years and was released in 2009.

Speculation has surfaced on Mantronix and Kurtis Mantronik fan sites regarding a reunion of the original Mantronix line-up, but as of 2019, a reunion has yet to materialize.

Touré Embden is listed as having lived in both Stone Mountain and Lilburn, Georgia.

References

External links 
 [ AllMusic.com Biography - MC Tee]
 Discogs.com Profile - MC Tee
 

1964 births
Living people
American rappers of Jamaican descent
Jamaican emigrants to the United States
Jamaican rappers
Mantronix members
Rappers from Brooklyn
United States Air Force airmen
21st-century American rappers
Sleeping Bag Records artists